This is a table containing the figures from the WHO Influenza A Situation Updates issued in April 2009 roughly once a day.  Where more than one update was issued in a day, the figures are from the last update that day.  The table can by sorted by country, date of first confirmed case or date of first confirmed case by continent.

This presentation of the data in these and other tables shows the progression, peaks, and, eventually, decline of the epidemic in each country and continent.

Previous month | Next month

Chart

Confirmed cases

Deaths

Maps

References

April
Articles which contain graphical timelines